Lepidoplaga is a genus of moths of the family Crambidae.

Species
Lepidoplaga flavicinctalis (Snellen, 1890)

References

Pyraustinae
Crambidae genera
Taxa named by William Warren (entomologist)